The House Is Serious (La Casa es Seria) is a musical short film directed by Lucien Jaquelux (credited as Jaquelux). It belongs to a series of French films about Argentinian tango singer Carlos Gardel made by Paramount Pictures in its French studio Joinville-him-Pont. The film stars Gardel and Argentinian-Spanish actress Imperio Argentina. The script was written by the Brazilian Alfredo Le Pera. Gardel sings two songs with Le Pera; Memory malevo and Want to me, the latter never having been recorded on film.

It premiered on May 19th in 1933 in the Cinema Suipacha in Buenos Aires. All copies of the film have been lost, including the original copies that were destroyed in 1940 during World War II when the German troops bombed Paramount's studios in Joinville. Only it’s audio has survived, recorded in Vitaphone disks.

Background 
In 1931, Carlos Gardel was hired by American company Paramount to make his first sound motion picture, Lights of Buenos Aires. The film was made at Paramount's studio in Joinville-him-Pont, 40 kilometers southwest of the French capital. The studio was dedicated to producing films for non-American markets. The following year, however, Paramount France was in the midst of a crisis. The Great Depression and a difficult political climate just before Hitler seized power created challenges for the movie's creation. Even with this, and Carlos Gardel deciding to return to Buenos Aires, Paramount chose to move forward with new movies that included the Argentinian singer. 

In September 1932 the first feature film of the series titled Wait for Me was recorded. Wait for Me was directed by Louis Gasnier using an adapted American script. 
Immediately after the filming of Wait for Me ended, Paramount convened with French director Lucien Jaquelux and Argentinian and Spanish actress Imperio Argentina to make The House Is Serious. The studio arranged for Alfredo Le Pera to write the script and collaborate with Carlos Gardel on the music and lyrics. Filming took place in October 1932. Following the filming of The House Is Serious Paramount began work on Suburban Melody, Gardel's third French feature film.

Distribution 
 Carlos Gardel.
 Imperio Argentina.
 Lolita Benavente.
 Josita Hernán.
 Manuel Paris.

See also 
 Carlos Gardel
 Cinema of Argentina
 Cinema of Latin America
 Tango

References

External links 
 The Lights of Buenos Aires. It see the film gratuitamente. Feature film in black and white.
 Synthesis of the life of Carlos Gardel.

1933 films
French musical films
1930s Spanish-language films
1933 musical films
Argentine black-and-white films
Argentine musical films
Lost Argentine films
1933 lost films
French short films
Argentine short films